In mathematics, a uniformly bounded representation   of a locally compact group  on a Hilbert space  is a homomorphism into the bounded invertible operators which is continuous for the strong operator topology, and such that  is finite. In 1947 Béla Szőkefalvi-Nagy established that any uniformly bounded representation of the integers or the real numbers is unitarizable, i.e. conjugate by an invertible operator to a unitary representation. For the integers this gives a criterion for an invertible operator to be similar to a unitary operator: the operator norms of all the positive and negative powers must be uniformly bounded. The result on unitarizability of uniformly bounded representations was extended in 1950 by Dixmier, Day and Nakamura-Takeda to all locally compact amenable groups, following essentially the method of proof of Sz-Nagy. The result is known to fail for non-amenable groups such as  SL(2,R) and the free group on two generators.  conjectured that a locally compact group is amenable if and only if every uniformly bounded representation is unitarizable.

Statement
Let G be a locally compact amenable group and let Tg be a homomorphism of G into GL(H), the group of an invertible operators on a Hilbert space such that

for every x in H the vector-valued gx on G is continuous;
the operator norms of the operators Tg are uniformly bounded.

Then there is a positive invertible operator S on H such that S Tg S−1 is unitary for every g in G.

As a consequence, if T is an invertible operator with all its positive and negative powers uniformly bounded in operator norm, then T is conjugate by a positive invertible operator to a unitary.

Proof
By assumption the continuous functions

generate a separable unital C* subalgebra A of the uniformly bounded continuous functions on G. By construction the algebra is invariant under left translation. By amenability there is an invariant state φ on A. It follows that

is a new inner product on H satisfying

where

So there is a positive invertible operator P such that

By construction

Let S be the unique positive square root of P. Then

Applying S−1 to x and y, it follows that

Since the operators

 
are invertible, it follows that they are unitary.

Examples of non-unitarizable representations

SL(2,R)
These representations can be realized on functions on the circle or on the real line: the Cayley transform provides the unitary equivalence between the two realizations.

In fact for 0 < σ < 1/2 and f, g continuous functions on the circle define

where

Since the function kσ is integrable, this integral converges. In fact

where the norms are the usual L2 norms.

The functions

are orthogonal with

Since these quantities are positive, (f,g)σ defines an inner product. The Hilbert space completion is denoted by Hσ.

For F, G continuous functions of compact support on R, define

Since, regarded as distributions, the Fourier transform of |x|2σ – 1 is Cσ|t|−2σ for some positive constant Cσ, the above expression can be rewritten:

Hence it is an inner product. Let Hσ denote its Hilbert space completion.
 
The Cayley transform gives rise to an operator U:

U extends to an isometry of Hσ onto H 'σ. Its adjoint is given by

The Cayley transform exchanges the actions by Möbius transformations of SU(1,1) on S1 and of SL(2, R) on R.

The operator U intertwines corresponding actions of SU(1,1) on Hσ and SL(2,R''') on H 'σ.

For g in SU(1,1) given by

with

and f continuous, set

For g in SL(2,R) given by

with ad – bc = 1, set

If g ' corresponds to g under the Cayley transform then

Polar decomposition shows that SL(2,R) = KAK with K = SO(2) and A the subgroup of positive diagonal matrices. K corresponds to the diagonal matrices in SU(1,1). Since evidently K acts unitarily on Hσ and A acts unitarily on H 'σ, both representations are unitary. The representations are irreducible because the action of the Lie algebra on the basis vectors fm is irreducible. This family of irreducible unitary representations is called the complementary series.

 constructed an analytic continuation of this family of representations as follows. If s = σ + iτ, g lies in SU(1,1) and f in Hσ, define

Similarly if g ' lies in SL(2,R) and F in  H 'σ, define

As before the unitary U intertwines these two actions. K acts unitarily on Hσ and A by a uniformly bounded representation on H 'σ. The action of the standard basis of the complexification Lie algebra on this basis can be computed:

If the representation were unitarizable for τ ≠ 0, then the similarity operator T on Hσ would have to commute with K, since K preserves the original inner product. The vectors Tfm would therefore still be orthogonal for the new inner product and  
the operators

would satisfy the same relations for

In this case

It is elementary to verify that infinitesimally such a representation cannot exist if τ ≠ 0.

Indeed, let v0 = f '0 and set

Then

for some constant c. On the other hand,

Thus c must be real and positive. The formulas above show that

so the representation πs is unitarizable only if τ = 0.

Free group on two generators
The group G = SL(2,R) contains the discrete group Γ = SL(2,Z) as a closed subgroup of finite covolume, since this subgroup acts on the upper half plane with a fundamental domain of finite hyperbolic area. The group SL(2,Z) contains a subgroup of index 12 isomorphic to F2 the free group on two generators. Hence G has a subgroup Γ1 of finite covolume, isomorphic to F2. If L is a closed subgroup of finite covolume in a locally compact group G, and π is non-unitarizable uniformly bounded representation of G on a Hilbert space L, then its restriction to L is uniformly bounded and non-unitarizable. For if not, applying a bounded invertible operator, the inner product can be made invariant under L; and then in turn invariant under G by redefining

As in the previous proof, uniform boundedess guarantees that the norm defined by this inner product is
equivalent to the original inner product. But then the original representation would be unitarizable on G, a contradiction. The same argument works for any discrete subgroup of G of finite covolume. In particular the surface groups, which are cocompact subgroups, have uniformly bounded representations that are not unitarizable.

The first such examples are described in 
, where an analogue of the complementary series is constructed.

Later  gave a related but simpler construction, on the Hilbert space H = 2(F2), of a holomorphic family of uniformly bounded representations πz of F2 for  |z| < 1; these are non-unitarizable when  1/√3 < |z| < 1 and z is not real. Let L(g) denote the reduced word length on F2 for a given set of generators a, b. Let T be the bounded operator defined on basis elements by

where g ' is obtained by erasing the last letter in the expression of g as a reduced word; identifying F2 with the vertices of its Cayley graph, a rooted tree, this corresponds to passing from a vertex to the next closest vertex to the origin or root. For |z| < 1

is well-defined on finitely supported functions.  had earlier proved that it extends to a uniformly bounded representation on H satisfying

In fact it is easy to check that the operator 
λ(g)Tλ(g)−1 – T has finite rank, with rangeVg, the finite-dimensional space of functions supported on the set of vertices joining g to the origin. For on any function vanishing on this finite set, T and λ(g)Tλ(g)−1 are equal; and they both leave invariant Vg, on which they acts as contractions and adjoints of each other. Hence if f has finite support and norm 1,

For |z| < 1/√3, these representations are all similar to the regular representation λ. If on the other hand 1/√3 < |z| <1, then the operator

satisfies

where f in H is defined by

Thus, if z is not real, D has an eigenvalue which is not real. But then πz cannot be unitarizable, since otherwise D would be similar to a self-adjoint operator.

The Dixmier Problem
Jacques Dixmier asked in 1950 whether amenable groups are characterized by unitarizability''', i.e. the property that all their uniformly bounded representations are unitarizable.  This problem remains open to this day.

An elementary induction argument shows that a subgroup of a unitarizable group remains unitarizable.  Therefore, the von Neumann conjecture would have implied a positive answer to Dixmier's problem, had it been true.  In any case, it follows that a counter-example to Dixmier's conjecture could only be a non-amenable group without free subgroups. In particular, Dixmier's conjecture is true for all linear groups by the Tits alternative.

A criterion due to Epstein and Monod shows that there are also non-unitarizable groups without free subgroups. In fact, even some Burnside groups are non-unitarizable, as shown by Monod and Ozawa.

Considerable progress has been made by Pisier who linked unitarizability to a notion of factorization length. This allowed him to solve a modified form of the Dixmier problem.

The potential gap between unitarizability and amenability can be further illustrated by the following open problems, all of which become elementary if "unitarizable" were replaced by "amenable":

Is the direct product of two unitarizable groups unitarizable?
Is a directed union of unitarizable groups unitarizable?
If  contains a normal amenable subgroup  such  is unitarizable, does it follow that  is unitarizable?

Notes

References

Operator theory
Functional analysis
Representation theory